The San Francisco Bay Area, commonly known as the Bay Area, is a metropolitan region surrounding the San Francisco Bay estuaries in Northern California. The region is home to three major cities:  San Francisco, Oakland and, the largest, San Jose.

The Bay Area has been inhabited since antiquity, first by the Ohlone and Miwok peoples, followed by the Spanish, who first arrived in 1769 and established the area's first mission, Mission San Francisco de Asís, in 1776. After being ceded to the United States in 1848, the Bay Area grew immensely due to the California Gold Rush, establishing itself as one of the most important regions on the West Coast. Today, the Bay Area is the home of Silicon Valley, Wine Country, and numerous companies, universities, bridges, airports, and parks.

The Bay Area consists of nine counties (Alameda, Contra Costa, Marin, Napa, San Francisco, San Mateo, Santa Clara, Solano, and Sonoma) and 101 municipalities. One, San Francisco, is a consolidated city–county. California law makes no distinction between "city" and "town", and municipalities may use either term in their official names. The first municipalities to incorporate were Benicia and San Jose on March 27, 1850, while the most recent was Oakley on July 1, 1999.

See also 

 List of cities and towns in California
 List of communities in California
 List of largest California cities by population

References 

San Francisco
San Francisco

Cities
Cities